Cave Creek is a subterranean river in Boone County in the U.S. state of Missouri. The area of the stream is just west of Missouri Route 163 and about one half mile northwest of Pierpont.

Cave Creek was named for the fact it flows through a cave. It is located in Rock Bridge State Park.

See also
List of rivers of Missouri

References

Rivers of Boone County, Missouri
Rivers of Missouri
Subterranean rivers of the United States